Schachendorf (Croatian: Čajta, Hungarian: Csajta) is a town in the district of Oberwart in Burgenland in southeast Austria. According to the last census, 73% of the population are members of the Burgenland Croat minority, and 5% belong to the Hungarian minority.

Geography 
It lies on the border to Hungary, and there is a road crossing the border from Bucsu to Schachendorf.

Population

References

External links 

Cities and towns in Oberwart District